Orzeł Futsal Jelcz-Laskowice Sport Club – futsal club from Jelcz-Laskowice appearing from season 2015/2016 in 1st Polish futsal Division. Club was created from initiative of Futsal Lovers from Wrocław and surroundings. Club has the headquarter in Centrum of Sport and Recreation (CSIR) in Jelcz-Laskowice at Oławska street 46.

In season 2015/2016 Titular partner of club was Antonio Hotel, so the club has taken a part in 1st division games with name "KS Antonio Orzeł Futsal Jelcz-Laskowice". From May 2016, 1st team coach is Jesús Chus López García

Footnotes 
Oława.info about new coach.

References

External links 
 Official club site
 Club in 90 minutes base

Futsal clubs in Poland
Sport in Lower Silesian Voivodeship
Futsal clubs established in 2015
2015 establishments in Poland